Joseph William Kostal (January 1, 1876 – October 10, 1933), nicknamed "Cudgey", was an American Major League Baseball player who pitched two games for the  Louisville Colonels.  He pitched a total of two innings, gave up four runs, zero earned runs, and was charged with one error.  Kostal was born in Chicago, Illinois, and died at the age of 57 in Guelph, Ontario, Canada.

Note: His Baseball Reference Bio has him born on June 1, 1876.

References

External links

1876 births
1933 deaths
Major League Baseball pitchers
19th-century baseball players
Louisville Colonels players
Cairo Egyptians players
Grand Rapids Cabinet Makers players
Springfield Governors players
Mansfield Haymakers players
London Tecumsehs (baseball) players
Denver Grizzlies (baseball) players
Lagoon (minor league baseball) players
Spokane Smoke Eaters players
Portland Webfotts players
Portland Browns players
Seattle Siwashes players
Sioux City Soos players
Keokuk Indians players
Sioux City Packers players
Fort Dodge Gypsumites players
Fond du Lac Cubs players
Baseball players from Chicago